Abner Chipu (born 2 January 1972) is a retired South African long-distance runner. His specialties include Cross, Half Marathon, Marathon, Cross team event and the Half Marathon Team Event.

Achievements

Personal bests
3000 metres – 8:10.34 min (2002)
10,000 metres – 28:27.94 min (2002)
Half marathon – 1:01:15 hrs (1998) 
Marathon – 2:12:46 hrs (1999)

References

External links

1972 births
Living people
South African male long-distance runners
South African male marathon runners